Rick James (10 October 1939 – 24 September 2018) was an Antiguan actor, politician, journalist and mas pioneer.

Early life 

He began his education at Moravian School and continued on to Princess Margaret School. Involved with the 1st Antigua Scout Troop Anglican, James first left his home country to attend the 8th World Scout Jamboree in 1955 as a Queen's Scout.

An amateur enthusiast, he entered the Carnival mas as a designer, presenting The Remnants of Rome at the first Summer Carnival in 1957. James went on to win Band of the Year in 1962 with Interplanetary Flag Wavers and again in 1963 with Atlantis Revellers, making him the first back to back winner of the prize.

1961 was an important year for James. Travelling to Trinidad, he represented Antigua at the Pan American Games in the 100-yard sprint. Now a Master Scout, he also attended the 2nd Caribbean Scout Jamboree

Acting 

That same year, James secured a scholarship to study in the United States. Moving to San Francisco, he took up studies at Adult High School. A subsequent move to Los Angeles saw him enrol in acting school, studying under the tutelage of James Doohan. Rick made his Hollywood debut in the West Coast Premiere of Blood Knot produced and directed by Frank Silvera in 1965.

Moving to England, James resumed his career in the theatre, appearing in the West End (Sit Quietly on the Bollard and Shack-Shack) and Royal Exchange (Detective Story) before moving into television. He appeared in an episode of Dixon of Dock Green, two Play for Todays and Doctor Who (the 6-part story arc The Mutants). The actor was even offered a bit part in a James Bond movie (possibly Live and Let Die) but ultimately turned it down, having auditioned for a more substantial role.

Realising that he was not being taken seriously as an actor, James decided on a different career path. By the-mid 1970s, he became an operator for British Telecom, during which he became acquainted with a woman from Germany called Rita Jansen. They married in 1985 and the following year gave birth to a son, Sven.

A return to acting in the 1980s saw Rick appear in the penultimate episode of Blake's 7 entitled "Warlord" and various stage productions.

During these years, Rick wrote his first column for Tim Hector's Outlet Newspaper in Antigua about his experiences abroad, keeping in touch with his roots. Missing his homeland, James decided to move back there with his family in 1989.

Politics 

Returning home, the actor started his own theatre ensemble, playing short plays with small casts at beach hotels.

Dedicated and hard-working, James hoped to improve lives in his home country. When away acting, it was to put Antigua on the map. When entering politics, it was to make a difference at home.

In August 1991, James founded the Free and Fair Elections League and served as its secretary up until his death. In 1999, he led the Antigua Freedom Party and contested the 1999 general elections but did not win the St. John's Rural East seat, losing to Lester Bird.

For years, James, a patriot, was known for pushing the envelope for election reform in his home country. Over the years, he filed numerous election petitions in the High Court with his League conducting mick elections ahead of General Elections in his homeland. His patriotism won him heaps of respect and praise.

2011: Recommended that the Antigua & Barbuda Electoral Commission (ABEC) be dismantled and rebuilt from scratch to restore public confidence in that body.
2016: Loses a lawsuit challenging number of Ministers of Government named to the Antigua and Barbuda Labour Party Cabinet.

Death 

On 18 September 2018, James checked himself into Mount St. John's Medical Centre, complaining of feeling unwell. He died less than a week later at 6 am on 24 September 2018, of multiple organ failure.

References

External links 

1939 births
2018 deaths
Antigua and Barbuda activists
Antigua and Barbuda politicians
Deaths from multiple organ failure